Sceliphron, also known as black mud daubers or black mud-dauber wasps, is a genus of Hymenoptera of the Sphecidae family of wasps. They are solitary mud daubers and build nests made of mud. Nests are frequently constructed in shaded niches, often just inside of windows or vent openings, and it may take a female only a day to construct a cell requiring dozens of trips carrying mud. Females will add new cells one by one to the nest after each cell is provisioned. They provision these nests with spiders, such as crab spiders, orb-weaver spiders and jumping spiders in particular, as food for the developing larvae. Each mud cell contains one egg and is provided with several prey items. Females of some species lay a modest average of 15 eggs over their whole lifespan. Various parasites attack these nests, including several species of cuckoo wasps, primarily by sneaking into the nest while the resident mud dauber is out foraging.

As is the case with many insect genera, there are many tropical species. Some common temperate species include S. caementarium and S. curvatum.

Like other solitary wasps, Sceliphron species are not aggressive unless threatened. They are sometimes regarded as beneficial due to their control of spider populations, though the spiders themselves may be beneficial in controlling pest insects. Species such as Sceliphron curvatum are invasive in some parts of Europe, where they have been observed to rapidly increase their range in recent years.

Sceliphron species
There are 34 valid species of Sceliphron.
 Sceliphron arabs (Lepeletier de Saint Fargeau, 1845)
 Sceliphron argentifrons (Cresson, 1916)
 Sceliphron asiaticum (Linnaeus, 1758); Neotropics
Type locality In Indiis was interpreted as India; syn. S. figulum
 Sceliphron assimile (Dahlbom, 1843) – Clayman's mud dauber; Texas, Mexico and Caribbean island
 Sceliphron aterrimum (Marquet, 1875)
 Sceliphron caementarium (Drury, 1773) (Sphex) – black and yellow mud dauber, yellow-legged mud dauber, black-waisted mud dauber
North America, established in Europe and Pacific islands by the 1970s
 Sceliphron coromandelicum (Lepeletier, 1845)
 Sceliphron curvatum (Smith, 1870) – Asian mud dauber; Asia, Europe since 1970s
 Sceliphron deforme (F. Smith, 1856); Asia, reported from Europe in 2004
 Sceliphron destillatorium (Illiger, 1807); southern Palaearctic
 Sceliphron fasciatum (Lepeletier de Saint Fargeau, 1845)
 Sceliphron fervens (F. Smith, 1858)
 Sceliphron fistularium (Dahlbom, 1843); Neotropics
 Sceliphron formosum (F. Smith, 1856); Australia
 Sceliphron fossuliferum (Gribodo, 1895)
 Sceliphron funestum Kohl, 1918
 Sceliphron fuscum Klug, 1801
 Sceliphron intrudens (F. Smith, 1858)
 Sceliphron isaaci Jha and Farooqi, 1995
 Sceliphron jamaicense Fabricius, 1775; Mexico, Caribbean islands
 Sceliphron javanum Lepeletier, 1845
 Sceliphron laetum (F. Smith, 1856); Australia
 Sceliphron madraspatanum (Fabricius, 1781); Mediterranean
 Sceliphron murarium (F. Smith, 1863)
 Sceliphron neobilineatum Jha and Farooqi, 1995
 Sceliphron paraintrudens Jha and Farooqi, 1995
 Sceliphron pietschmanni Kohl, 1918
 Sceliphron quartinae (Gribodo 1884)
 Sceliphron rectum Kohl, 1918
 Sceliphron rufopictum (F. Smith, 1856)
 Sceliphron seistaniensis Jha and Farooqi, 1995
 Sceliphron shestakovi Gussakovskij, 1928
 Sceliphron spirifex (Linnaeus, 1758); Africa, southern Europe
 Sceliphron unifasciatum (F. Smith, 1860)

See also
 Chalybion
 Organ pipe mud dauber (Trypoxylon politum)

References

 Observations on the biology of  Sceliphron spirifex (Linnaeus, 1758) in Romagna, Pezzi G.

External links

 Short discussion on genus Sceliphron.
  Discussion on an Australian species, Sceliphron formosum
 Discussion on an American species, Sceliphron caementarium
 Online guide to eastern North American Sphecidae Documents how to differentiate Sceliphron caementarium from other Sphecids



Sphecidae
Apoidea genera
Taxa named by Johann Christoph Friedrich Klug